Pernarava Eldership is a Lithuanian eldership, located in the south western part of Kėdainiai District Municipality.

Eldership was created from the Pernarava selsovet in 1993.

Geography
The territory of Pernarava Eldership is located mostly in the Nevėžis Plain, but the western edges are in the East Samogitian Plateau. Relief is mostly flat, cultivated as agriculture lands. Forests cover 10 % of the eldership.

 Rivers: Šušvė (with Liedas), Aluona (with Žvaranta), Gynėvė
 Lakes and ponds: Angiriai Reservoir.
 Forests: Pernarava-Šaravai Forest.
 Protected areas: Lendrynė Ornitological Sanctuary.
 Nature monuments: Griniai Oak Tree

Places of interest
Catholic church of Crucified Jesus in Pernarava
Preikapė ancient burial place
Rugėnai memorial cross

Populated places 
Following settlements are located in the Pernarava Eldership (as for the 2011 census):

Towns: Pernarava
Villages: Aukštdvaris · Aukštkalniai · Blandžiai · Bumbulynė · Daukšai · Dratkalnis · Duogiai · Gegužiai · Gižiemiai · Gožiai · Grineliai · Griniai · Gučkampis · Jakšiai · Jankūnai · Juodgiris · Juodžiai · Kanapėna · Kantrimas · Kupsčiai · Langakiai · Laučynė · Lesčiukai · Mantigailiai · Milašiūnai · Milvydai · Paaluonys · Pakalniškiai · Paliediškiai · Paskotiškė · Pavinkšniai · Pelutava · Pernarava · Pesliškės · Preikapė · Rudakiai · Rugėnai · Sauskojai · Šliužiai · Vainikoniai · Vencloviškiai · Vytautėliai · Voskaičiai · Žostautai · Žostautėliai

References

Elderships in Kėdainiai District Municipality